The Journal of the American Medical Informatics Association is a peer-reviewed scientific journal covering research in the field of medical informatics published by the American Medical Informatics Association.

According to the Journal Citation Reports, the journal has a 2021 impact factor of 7.942. It is among the very top journals in the category "Medical Informatics."

References

External links 
 

Bimonthly journals
Publications established in 1994
Biomedical informatics journals
Oxford University Press academic journals
English-language journals
Academic journals associated with learned and professional societies of the United States